Kinsabba (also spelled Kansaba) is a town in northwestern Syria administratively belonging to the Latakia Governorate, located northeast of Latakia. Nearby localities include Slinfah to the south, al-Haffah to the southwest, Balloran and Umm al-Tuyour to the west, Qastal Ma'af to the northwest, al-Najiyah to the northeast, Qarqur to the east and Sirmaniyah to the southeast. According to the Syria Central Bureau of Statistics (CBS), Kinsabba had a population was 514 in 2004. It is the administrative center, but 16th largest locality, of the Kinsabba nahiyah ("subdistrict") which contains 35 localities with a collective population of 17,615. Its inhabitants are predominantly Christians.

References

Bibliography

Towns in Syria
Populated places in al-Haffah District
Christian communities in Syria